Thelosia truvena is a moth in the Apatelodidae family. It was described by William Schaus in 1896. It is found in Brazil (São Paulo).

The wingspan is about 30 mm. The forewings are brownish grey, finely speckled with darker scales. There is a straight brown basal line, followed by a brownish shade. There is also a minute brown spot in the cell, followed by a straight brown line. The hindwings are light fawn with two very indistinct transverse brownish lines.

References

Natural History Museum Lepidoptera generic names catalog

Apatelodidae
Moths described in 1896
Taxa named by William Schaus
Moths of South America